Hildur Nygren (22 March 1896–24 April 1962) was a teacher and Swedish politician with the Social Democrats. She was elected as a member to the executive committee of the Gävle city council. She sat in the Riksdag from 1941 to 1952, becoming the second female cabinet minister and the first female minister of education and ecclesiastical affairs in Swedish history.

References

Further reading

External links

Women government ministers of Sweden
Members of the Riksdag from the Social Democrats
Women members of the Riksdag
People from Gävle
20th-century Swedish educators
20th-century Swedish women politicians
20th-century Swedish politicians
1896 births
1962 deaths
Swedish Ministers of Education and Ecclesiastical Affairs